Billinghurst is a town in the General San Martín Partido of Buenos Aires Province, Argentina.

Billinghurst or Billingshurst may also refer to:

People
 Benson Dillon Billinghurst (1869–1935), American educator
 Charles Billinghurst (1818–1865), American politician
 Guillermo Billinghurst (1851–1915), Peruvian president
 Mariano Billinghurst (1810–1892), Argentine businessman and politician
 Manuela Billinghurst (1919–1967), Peruvian politician
 Rosa May Billinghurst (1875–1953), English  suffragette and women's rights activist
 Susana Ferrari Billinghurst (1914–1999), Argentine aviator

Other
 Billingshurst, a village and civil parish in the Horsham District of West Sussex, England
 Billingshurst (electoral division)
 Billingshurst F.C.

See also